Diabi Jacob Mmualefe (born 28 March 1958)  is a Botswana diplomat and is currently the Ambassador to Brazil with concurrent accreditation to Argentina, Chile, Guyana, Venezuela and CARICOM.

He was the First Secretary at the Embassy of Botswana in Addis Ababa, Ethiopia, Counsellor at the Embassy of Botswana in Stockholm, Sweden and later on the Botswana High Commission in London, United Kingdom. He held positions at Botswana's Ministry of Foreign Affairs before his ambassadorial appointment.

References

 

Botswana diplomats
Ambassadors of Botswana to Brazil
Ambassadors of Botswana to Argentina
Ambassadors of Botswana to Chile
Ambassadors of Botswana to Venezuela
High Commissioners of Botswana to Guyana
Living people
1958 births